Estonian Business School (EBS) is a private, higher-education university situated in Tallinn, Estonia. EBS offers business-related higher education in bachelor-, master- and doctoral levels. Estonian Business School also has a high school part, named EBS Gümnaasium which offers high school education from 10th to 12th grade and a Management Training Centre (EBS Juhtimiskoolituse Keskus) that offers different trainings and development programs.

History 
The Estonian Business School (EBS) was founded in 1988. The founders of the university were Professor Madis Habakuk (Estonia), Professor Marshall Fitzgerald (USA), Professor Rein Peterson (Canada) and Ilmar Martens (Canada). It was the first higher-education institution in the Soviet Union that offered an English language-based business education. The need for the creation of a new business-oriented curriculum was imminent during those times, in the light of perestroika.

Today 

Approximately 1,400 students are currently studying at EBS, and the school has partnership contracts with over 70 universities in Europe, America, Australia, and Asia.

All EBS Bachelor's, Master's and Doctoral programmes have been accredited by the Ministry of Education and Science of the Republic of Estonia. EBS is internationally accredited by the Central and East Europe Management Development Association (CEEMAN). Eduniversal (University ranking which provides information on the best Business Schools Eduniversal rankings) has awarded 4 Palmes to EBS. 4 Palmes excellence are only awarded to the top 200 business schools in the world. The 200 schools in the 4 Palmes League category are regarded as the 'Top business schools with significant international influence' . In 2014/15, it reached position 141.

See also 
 List of universities in Estonia

References

External links 
 

Business schools in Estonia
Education in Tallinn
1988 establishments in Estonia
Educational institutions established in 1988
Economy of Tallinn